Bowé orthohantavirus (BOWV) is a viral isolate detected in tissue samples from Crocidura douceti (musk shrew). The putative host shrews were captured in Bowé, Guinea, in February 2012. BOWV is closely related to Tanganya orthohantavirus, harbored by Crocidura theresae in the same region, as well as the Jeju orthohantavirus.

References 

Hantaviridae